Belmont High School is an Australian public high school located in Belmont, Victoria, a suburb in the city of Geelong. It is one of the largest public schools in Geelong.  The school was established in 1955 and as of 2019, it has an enrolment of over 1300 students from years 7 to 12.

The school has been progressively refurbished, with the most recent work costing $6.66 million and comprising new administration and staff areas, canteen, and four "learning centres".

There is a new Science-Technology centre called 'BioLab' that was completed in 2010 that is accessible for schools throughout Geelong to utilise.

Curriculum 
The school offers a programme which includes a core curriculum in years 7 - 8 (English, Mathematics, Science, Italian, Indonesian, Technology, Arts, Studies of Society and Environment, Health and Physical Education). At years 9 to 12 a wide range of pathways are available. These include the Victorian Certificate of Education (VCE), Vocational Education Training (VET), Victorian Certificate of Applied Learning
 (VCAL) and school-based apprenticeships.

Belmont High School is one of 37 Victorian Government secondary schools providing a Select Entry Accelerated Learning Programme to address the learning needs of their gifted and high potential students. This allows these students to begin VCE subjects in Year 9 and complete school a year earlier if they wish.

The school also offers specialised programmes catering for international students.

Incidents 
On the 8 August 2008, a fire swept through a portable classroom, taking firefighters 40 minutes to control the blaze and another 90 minutes to fully damp down the site. One portable classroom was destroyed.
There was also a fire in a science room, causing damage that had to be fixed over the start of 2011 holidays.
On 19 April 2018 a shooting threat sent the school into lockdown. Police attended the school and upon realising that the threat was a hoax students were briefed on the situation and the day continued as normal.

Notable alumni 
Chrissy Amphlett, lead singer of the Divinyls
Esther Anderson, Gold Logie nominated actress who portrays Charlie Buckton on Home and Away
Cheryl Barker, opera singer
Peter Coleman-Wright, opera singer
Ian Cover, Coodabeens
Brooke Davis, author
Adrian Leijer, Olympic Olyroo Representative and Melbourne Victory player
Tim O'Neill, CFL player
Ezekiel Ox, lead singer of Mammal
Dave Thornton, Comedian and regular panellist of The Project

References

External links 
 Belmont High School Website

Schools in Geelong
Public high schools in Victoria (Australia)
Rock Eisteddfod Challenge participants
Educational institutions established in 1955
1955 establishments in Australia